Heritage College Perth is an independent Christadelphian co-educational primary and secondary day school, located in , a suburb situated in the foothills of Perth, Western Australia.

Established in 2006, Heritage College Perth is one of five Christadelphian Heritage Colleges in Australia; the other four are located in Morisset, Adelaide, Sydney, and Melbourne.

See also 

 Heritage Colleges (Australia)
 List of schools in the Perth metropolitan area

References

External links 
 Heritage College Perth

Private primary schools in Perth, Western Australia
Private secondary schools in Perth, Western Australia
P
Educational institutions established in 2006
Christadelphian organizations
2006 establishments in Australia
Forrestfield, Western Australia